EJ 675 (type 675) is a double-decker electric multiple unit by Škoda Vagonka a subsidiary of Škoda Transportation, operated by the Ukrainian state railways Ukrzaliznytsia. It is a variant of the Czech Railways class 471 "City Elefant" adapted for 1,520 mm gauge railways.

History 
Two electric trains of the 675 EJ series were purchased Ukrzaliznytsia Southern Railways in preparation for the UEFA Euro 2012 soccer championship for EUR 39.9 million. They were to be the first of a series of between 50 and 60 trains intended to reorganize inter-regional passenger traffic, however no further units were purchased.

The trains were used on a series of routes, centered around Kharkiv reaching Donetsk, Dnipro, Kyiv, Luhansk, Mariupol and Simferopol. Following the 2014 Russian occupation of Crimea, Donetsk and Luhansk, the trains served mainly the route between Kharkiv and Kyiv, gradually extended westwards towards Vinnytsia and Ternopil.

Currently, both trainsets are out of use. In September 2019 Ukrzaliznytsia was incapable of undertaking such heavy work, and was tendering internationally to find a company who will be able to carry out the necessary repairs, . In April 2021 the trainsets were undergoing major repairs in Ukrzaliznytsia's own Kyiv Electric Car Repair Plant and by the Czech Škoda manufacturer in the Czech Republic. The first of the two trains overhaul was expected to be finished by the end of 2021, and the second in early 2022.

Characterization and electric equipment 
The electric multiple unit consists of two power cars and four trailer cars in between. It has at total of 623 seats, of which 46 are first class (on the second floor of power cars), 577 are second class. The trains are equipped with 4 lifts for wheelchairs and special toilets.

Car bodies made of aluminium.

The total traction power is 4,000 kW (8 induction motors of 500 kW each).

References

External links 
 

Electric multiple units of Ukraine
Škoda locomotives
Train-related introductions in 2011
25 kV AC multiple units
3000 V DC multiple units